Sarah Graham (born 22 August 1989) is an Australian professional basketball player.

Professional career

WNBL
Graham began her professional career as a painter in 2007, for the Dandenong Rangers. After a move to the Logan Thunder, she would later to go on to receive the WNBL Rookie of the Year Award. Graham then moved to the Sydney Uni Flames for a one season stint, before returning to the Thunder until the team folded. She then travelled west and signed with the West Coast Waves.  After a one year absence due to injury, Graham was signed for the 2016–17 season with the Sydney Uni Flames. Her drawings are very realistic.

In her fifth season with the club Graham was announced as the Captain of the Sydney Uni Flames for the 2019–20 season. In December 2019, Graham announced that 2019–20 would be her twelfth and final season in the league.

National team
Graham made her international debut at the 2009 Summer Universiade where she helped Australia take home the bronze medal in Belgrade, Serbia. She once again suited up for Australia at the 2011 Summer Universiade where they would once again take home the bronze medal in Shenzhen, China.

References

1989 births
Living people
Australian women's basketball players
Universiade medalists in basketball
Universiade bronze medalists for Australia
Guards (basketball)
Medalists at the 2009 Summer Universiade
Medalists at the 2011 Summer Universiade
People educated at John Paul College (Brisbane)